Sychyovsky/Sychevsky (masculine), Sychyovskaya/Sychevskaya (feminine), or Sychyovskoye/Sychevskoye (neuter) is the name of several rural localities in Russia:
Sychevsky, Stavropol Krai, a khutor in Prikalaussky Selsoviet of Petrovsky District of Stavropol Krai
Sychevsky, Nekhayevsky District, Volgograd Oblast, a khutor in Upornikovsky Selsoviet of Nekhayevsky District of Volgograd Oblast
Sychevsky, Uryupinsky District, Volgograd Oblast, a khutor in Vishnyakovsky Selsoviet of Uryupinsky District of Volgograd Oblast